Vaccine-associated enhanced respiratory disease (VAERD), or simply enhanced respiratory disease (ERD), refers to an adverse event where an exacerbated course of respiratory disease occurs with higher incidence in the vaccinated population in comparison with the control group. It is one of the barriers against vaccine development and can lead to its failure.

Immunologically, VAERD is characterized with an exaggerated Th2 response and eosinophilic pulmonary infiltrations. It is thought to arise as a result of antibody-mediated complement activation followed by weak neutralization.

Historical instances of the phenomenon were seen in vaccine candidates for respiratory syncytial virus, SARS-CoV, Middle East Respiratory Syndrome (MERS), as well as some Influenza strains.

During the efforts to develop COVID-19 vaccines, whose target, SARS-CoV2, belongs to the same viral subfamily as SARS-CoV and MERS, concerns were raised about the possibility of exhibiting VAERD. Despite being monitored, the effect wasn't shown in phase III clinical trials for both Tozinameran and the Moderna vaccine.

References 

Vaccination
Drug-induced diseases